The Franklinton Apartments at Broad and Hawkes are a set of historic buildings in the Franklinton neighborhood of Columbus, Ohio. The buildings were built in 1900 and listed on the National Register of Historic Places in 2005. The rowhouse buildings are on West Broad Street, in the commercial center of the neighborhood. The two buildings are in an L-shaped plan and contain 22 apartments. The buildings are significant as they represent the neighborhood's residential investment following an industrial boom. They are one set of four L-shaped corner rowhouses built in Franklinton in 1900, and another was built in 1910. It is a defined property type relatively unique to the neighborhood, with only one other known example elsewhere in the city.

See also
 National Register of Historic Places listings in Columbus, Ohio

References

1900 establishments in Ohio
Apartment buildings in Ohio
Franklinton (Columbus, Ohio)
National Register of Historic Places in Columbus, Ohio
Residential buildings completed in 1900
Residential buildings on the National Register of Historic Places in Ohio
Vernacular architecture in Ohio
Broad Street (Columbus, Ohio)